Antrechinus mortenseni is a species of sea urchin of the family Urechinidae. Their armour is covered with spines. Antrechinus mortenseni was first scientifically described in 1990 by David & Mooi.

References 

Urechinidae
Animals described in 1990